Capital punishment, also known as the death penalty, is a state-sanctioned practice of killing a person as a punishment for a crime. Historically, capital punishment has been used in almost every part of the world. Currently, the large majority of countries have either abolished or discontinued the practice.

The 193 member states of the United Nations, and the two observer states, are usually divided in four categories based on their use of capital punishment:

53 (27%) maintain the death penalty in both law and practice.
24 (12%) permit its use for ordinary crimes, but have abolished it de facto, namely, according to Amnesty International standards, they have not used it for at least 10 years and are believed to have a policy or established practice of not carrying out executions.
7 (4%) have abolished it for all crimes except those committed under exceptional circumstances (such as during war).
111 (57%) have completely abolished it, most recently: Zambia (2022), Equatorial Guinea (2022), Papua New Guinea (2022), the Central African Republic (2022), Sierra Leone (2021), Kazakhstan (2021), and Chad (2020).

Since 1990, eleven countries (China, Congo, Iran, Nigeria, Pakistan, North Korea, Saudi Arabia, South Sudan, Sudan, USA and Yemen) have executed offenders who were under the age of 18 or 21 at the time the crime was committed, contravening the Convention on the Rights of the Child.

In 2013, public executions were carried out by the governments of Iran, North Korea, Saudi Arabia, and Somalia.

In some countries, the practice of extrajudicial execution outside their own formal legal frameworks occurs sporadically or systematically (e.g. the Philippines, see Philippine drug war).

Global overview

Africa
In Africa, many countries still have capital punishment. However, Algeria, Cameroon, Eritrea, Eswatini, Ghana, Kenya, Liberia, Mali, Mauritania, Morocco, Niger, Tanzania, and Tunisia have moratoria that have been in place for over a decade making the countries abolitionist in practice, but retain the death penalty in law. Capital punishment in Nigeria is in some states de facto abolitionist and in some states retentionist. In 2018, Burkina Faso repealed death for civilian crimes, and the Gambia announced a moratorium as a first step toward abolition. Chad abolished capital punishment in 2020, Sierra Leone in 2021, and the Central African Republic, Equatorial Guinea and Zambia in 2022.

Americas
In the Caribbean countries, the death penalty exists at least de jure, except in the Dominican Republic and Haiti, which abolished it in 1969 and 1987, respectively. Grenada is abolitionist in practice, and its last execution was in 1978. The last execution in the Caribbean, and the last in the Americas outside the United States, was in Saint Kitts and Nevis in 2008. In Central and South America, the death penalty exists in Belize and Guyana, though it has not been used since 1985 and 1997. In Brazil, Chile, El Salvador, Guatemala, and Peru, executions are only legal in specific circumstances, such as war crimes, and were abolished for civil crimes. Opinion polls stating sentiment for governments to return to capital punishment remain high in many Caribbean countries, and pressure on politicians to retain it is high.

Asia
Most executions worldwide take place in Asia. China is the world's most active death penalty country; according to Amnesty International, China executes more people than the rest of the world combined each year. However, not all of China is retentionist, as Hong Kong and Macau have abolished it for all crimes before their handover to China. In Iran and Saudi Arabia, the numbers of executions are also very high. Of the 12 countries/region with a "very high" Human Development Index which practice executions, 10 are in Asia: Japan, Taiwan, Singapore, Malaysia, Saudi Arabia, Kuwait, Bahrain, Oman, Qatar, and the United Arab Emirates, although since 2018 Malaysia does have a moratorium. In 2017, Mongolia repealed the death penalty for all crimes and in 2021 Kazakhstan, that was already abolitionist for ordinary crimes, abolished it also for crimes under special circumstances. India executes criminals rarely. 30 executions have taken place in India since 1991. The latest execution was that of four perpetrators of a gang rape and murder case on 20 March 2020.
According to a 2017 report by the Myanmar National Human Rights Commission, 709 prisoners in 26 prisons across the country have had death sentences commuted to life imprisonment.

Europe

The European Union holds a strong position against the death penalty; its abolition is a key objective for the Union's human rights policy. Abolition is also a pre-condition for entry into the European Union. In Europe, only Belarus continues to actively use capital punishment.

Capital punishment has been completely abolished in all European countries except for Belarus and Russia, the latter of which has a moratorium and has not conducted an execution since 1996. The absolute ban on the death penalty is enshrined in both the Charter of Fundamental Rights of the European Union (EU) and two widely adopted protocols of the European Convention on Human Rights of the Council of Europe, and is thus considered a central value. Of all modern European countries, San Marino, Portugal and the Netherlands were the first to abolish capital punishment, and now only Belarus still uses capital punishment. In 2012, Latvia became the last EU member state to abolish capital punishment in wartime.

Post-Soviet states
Russia retains the death penalty in law, but there has been a moratorium since 1996, making it de facto abolitionist. The last execution on Russian territory was in Chechnya in 1999. Of the other former Soviet republics, only Belarus and Tajikistan have not formally abolished capital punishment, and only Belarus uses it in practice.

Oceania
It was in the Kingdom of Tahiti (when the island was independent), in 1824, that for the first time in the world, a legislative assembly abolished the death penalty. Tahiti commuted the death penalty to banishment. Nearly all countries in this region have abolished the death penalty as a form of punishment, and the last country that still has it in law (Tonga) has not used it in many decades and is considered de facto abolitionist. The last known executions in this region took place in Tonga in 1982.

Human Development Index
There are 65 sovereign states with a very high human development according to the 2021/2022 Human Development Report, of these:

14 (22%) maintain the death penalty in both law and practice: Singapore, Japan, United States, United Arab Emirates, Bahrain, Saudi Arabia, Qatar, Kuwait, Oman, the Bahamas, Trinidad and Tobago, Belarus, Malaysia, and Thailand.
3 (5%) permit its use for ordinary crimes, but have not used it for at least 10 years and are believed to have a policy or established practice of not carrying out executions: South Korea, Brunei, and Russia.
2 (3%) have abolished it for all crimes except those committed under exceptional circumstances (such as during war): Israel and Chile.
46 (71%) have completely abolished it.

Singapore has the highest Human Development Index of all the countries that use the death penalty, while Japan has both the highest inequality-adjusted HDI and the highest planetary pressures–adjusted HDI.

Numbers executed in 2019
At least 20 countries performed executions in 2019:

 Africa (5 countries): Botswana (1), Egypt (32+), Somalia (13+), South Sudan (11+), Sudan (1+)
 Americas (1 country): United States (22)
 Asia-Pacific (13 countries): Bahrain (3), Bangladesh (2), China (Unknown, likely over 1000) Iran (251+), Iraq (100+), Japan (3), North Korea (Unknown), Pakistan (14+), Saudi Arabia (184+), Singapore (4), Syria (Unknown), Vietnam (Unknown), Yemen (7+)
 Europe (1 country): Belarus (2+)

Precise numbers are not available for many countries, so the total number of executions is unknown. Other countries like Libya have conducted extrajudicial executions.

Capital punishment by continents

Africa
There are 54 member states of the United Nations in Africa, of these:

13 (24%) maintain the death penalty in both law and practice.
15 (28%) permit its use for ordinary crimes, but have not used it for at least 10 years and are believed to have a policy or established practice of not carrying out executions.
1 (2%) has abolished it for all crimes except those committed under exceptional circumstances (such as during war).
25 (46%) have completely abolished it.

Many African countries have carried out no executions for over 10 years, but are not believed to have an abolitionist policy or established practice.

Nigeria is only retentionist in the northern states that use sharia law, and in some southern states such as Imo. Many southern states are abolitionist in practice due to a moratorium that has been in place since 2004.

The countries in Africa that most recently abolished the death penalty are Zambia (2022), Equatorial Guinea (2022), Central African Republic (2022), Sierra Leone (2021), and Chad (2020).

Executions in Africa in 2019: Botswana (1), Egypt (29+), Somalia (13+), South Sudan (7+).

Americas
There are 35 member states of the United Nations in the Americas, of these:

13 (37%) maintain the death penalty in both law and practice.
1 (3%) permits its use for ordinary crimes, but has not used it for at least 10 years and is believed to have a policy or established practice of not carrying out executions.
5 (14%) have abolished it for all crimes except those committed under exceptional circumstances (such as during war).
16 (46%) have completely abolished it.

Many Caribbean countries have carried out no executions for over 10 years, but are not believed to have an abolitionist policy or established practice.

Currently (2022), the United States is the only country in the Americas to conduct executions for civil purposes. However while capital punishment applies nationwide on the federal level, only some states can be considered retentionist for ordinary crimes, as federal death penalty only applies for crimes committed in exceptional circumstances. Of the 50 states and one federal district, 23 are abolitionist for ordinary crimes and 2 are abolitionist in practice for ordinary crimes. Also 5 states have imposed formal moratoriums and 1 state has imposed an informal moratorium, but cannot be considered abolitionist in practice for ordinary crimes, as the moratoriums have been in place for under a decade. The last execution elsewhere in the region was in Saint Kitts and Nevis in 2008.

The countries in the Americas that most recently abolished the death penalty are Suriname (2015), Argentina (2009), and Bolivia (2009). Guatemala abolished the death penalty for civil cases in 2017.

Executions in the Americas in 2019: United States (22).

Asia
There are 42 member states of the United Nations in Asia, and one observer state, of these:

26 (60%) maintain the death penalty in both law and practice.
6 (14%) permit its use for ordinary crimes, but have not used it for at least 10 years and are believed to have a policy or established practice of not carrying out executions.
1 (2%) has abolished it for all crimes except those committed under exceptional circumstances (such as during war).
10 (23%) have completely abolished it.

The information above does not include Taiwan, which is not a UN member. Taiwan practises the death penalty by shooting, and conducted one execution each in 2016, 2018, and 2020.

Hong Kong and Macau are also listed below (they abolished the death penalty before their handover to China), but they are not included in the figures above as they do not have UN membership separate from China. This makes China retentionist only in the mainland.

Iraq also has a regional variety of retentionism and abolitionism, as Iraqi Kurdistan is de facto abolitionist for ordinary crimes due to a moratorium that has been in place since 2007. The rest of Iraq (the majority of the country) is fully retentionist.

Indonesia has an informal moratorium and Malaysia a formal one, but both have been in place for under a decade (both since 2018) and therefore executions resuming are still very possible. Neither Indonesia nor Malaysia have plans to abolish it. Between May 2018 and March 2019, Malaysia's government, which was then led by a progressive coalition, did previously consider abolishing the death penalty, but relented under public pressure and decided to just have plans to abolish mandatory capital punishment.

On 25 July 2022, Myanmar carried out its first executions since 1988, making the country retentionist again.

The countries in Asia that most recently abolished the death penalty are Kazakhstan (2021), Mongolia (2017), and Uzbekistan (2008).

In 2019, Asia had the world's five leading practitioners of capital punishment: China, Iran, North Korea, Saudi Arabia, and Vietnam.

Executions in Asia in 2019: Bahrain (3), Bangladesh (2), China (Unknown), Iran (251+), Japan (3), North Korea (Unknown), Pakistan (14+), Saudi Arabia (184+), Singapore (4), Syria (Unknown), Vietnam (Unknown), Yemen (7+).

Europe

There are 48 member states of the United Nations in Europe, and one observer state, of these:

1 (2%) maintains the death penalty in both law and practice.
1 (2%) permits its use for ordinary crimes, but has not used it for at least 10 years and is believed to have a policy or established practice of not carrying out executions.
47 (96%) have completely abolished it.

Abolition of death penalty is a pre-condition for entry into the European Union, which considers capital punishment a "cruel and inhuman" practice and "not been shown in any way to act as a deterrent to crime".

Since 1999, Belarus has been the only recognised country in Europe to carry out executions. 2009, 2015, 2020 are the first three years in recorded history when Europe was completely free of executions.

The countries in Europe that most recently abolished the death penalty are Bosnia and Herzegovina (2019), Latvia (2012), and Albania (2007).

Executions in Europe in 2019: Belarus (2+).

Oceania
There are 14 member states of the United Nations in Oceania, of these:

1 (7%) permits its use for ordinary crimes, but has not used it for at least 10 years and is believed to have a policy or established practice of not carrying out executions.
13 (93%) have completely abolished it.

Only Tonga has not formally abolished capital punishment despite not using the practice since 1982.

The countries in Oceania that most recently abolished the death penalty are Papua New Guinea (2022), Nauru (2016), and Fiji (2015).

Abolition chronology

The table below lists in chronological order the 111 independent states, that are either UN members or have UN observer status, that have completely abolished the death penalty. In the hundred years following the abolition of capital punishment by Venezuela in 1863, only 11 more countries followed, not counting temporary abolitions which were later reversed. From the 1960s onwards, abolition became far more popular. 4 countries abolished capital punishment in the 1960s (a record up to that time for any decade), 11 in the 1970s, and a further 10 in the 1980s. After the end of the Cold War, many more countries followed. 36 countries abolished capital punishment in the 1990s, with 9 in 1990 alone, 23 in the 2000s, 11 in the 2010s, and 7 so far in the 2020s. Since 1985, there have been only five years when no country has abolished the death penalty: 2001, 2003, 2011, 2013, and 2018.

Note: Where a country has abolished, re-instated, and abolished again (e.g. Philippines, Switzerland, Portugal, Italy) only the later abolition date is included. Countries which have abolished and since reinstated (e.g. Liberia) are not included. Non-independent territories are considered being under the jurisdiction of their parent country – which leads to unexpectedly late abolition dates for the UK, New Zealand and the Netherlands, where Jersey (UK), the Cook Is (NZ), and the Netherlands Antilles, were the last territories of those states to abolish capital punishment, and all were rather later than the more well-known abolitions on the respective mainlands. References are in the continental tables above and are not repeated here.

See also
List of most recent executions by jurisdiction
American Convention on Human Rights
European Convention on Human Rights
Second Optional Protocol to the International Covenant on Civil and Political Rights
Life imprisonment
Corporal punishment

References

External links

 Amnesty International
 The Death Penalty Worldwide
 Countries retaining death penalty fail to give details of executions – United Nations, 14 July 2005
 Second Optional Protocol to the International Covenant on Civil and Political Rights
 European Convention on Human Rights - Protocol 13
 American Convention on Human Rights - Protocol to Abolish the Death Penalty
 Death Penalty in Asia-Pacific
 Monthly updates of world-wide executions
 Hands Off Cain (results may vary)
 Abolition UK
 Death Penalty Worldwide Academic research database on the laws, practice, and statistics of capital punishment for every death penalty country in the world.

 
Capital punishment